Rick Douglas Husband (July 12, 1957 – February 1, 2003) was an American astronaut and fighter pilot. He traveled into space twice: as pilot of STS-96 and commander of STS-107. He and the rest of the crew of STS-107 were killed when Columbia disintegrated during reentry into the Earth's atmosphere. Husband is a recipient of the Congressional Space Medal of Honor.

Early life, education and training
Husband was born on July 12, 1957, in Amarillo, Texas. At the age of 17, he earned his pilot's license while flying out of Tradewind Airport. He graduated with honors from Amarillo High School in 1975. Husband earned a Bachelor of Science degree in mechanical engineering from Texas Tech University in 1980, after 5 years of study. Upon graduation he was commissioned as a pilot in the United States Air Force, having been enrolled in ROTC his last two years of college. Husband underwent pilot training at Vance Air Force Base, in Enid, Oklahoma. This was followed by Land Survival School at Fairchild Air Force Base, in Spokane, Washington, and Fighter Lead-in School in New Mexico. Evelyn and Rick were married on February 27, 1982. Rick Husband trained in the F-4 at Homestead Air Force Base next.

U.S. Air Force career
Husband was assigned to a squadron at Moody Air Force Base in Valdosta, Georgia flying the F-4E. Rick then transferred to George AFB, in Victorville, California in December 1985, where he became an F-4 instructor.  By then he had accumulated 1000 hours of flying time.

In December 1987, Husband was assigned to Edwards Air Force Base in California, where he attended the USAF Test Pilot School class 88A along with future Canadian Space Agency astronaut Chris Hadfield. Upon completion of test pilot school, Husband served as a test pilot flying the F-4 and all five models of the F-15 Eagle. In the F-15 Combined Test Force, Husband was the program manager for the Pratt & Whitney F100-PW-229 increased performance engine, and also served as the F-15 Aerial Demonstration Pilot.

In June 1992, Husband was assigned to the Aircraft and Armament Evaluation Establishment at Boscombe Down, England, as an exchange test pilot with the Royal Air Force. At Boscombe Down, Husband was the Tornado GR1 and GR4 Project Pilot and served as a test pilot in the Hawk, Hunter, Buccaneer, Jet Provost, Tucano, and Harvard.

Husband logged over 3,800 hours of flight time in more than 40 different types of aircraft.

NASA career
Husband was selected as an astronaut candidate by NASA in December 1994, the same week he was promoted to lieutenant colonel. He reported to the Johnson Space Center in March 1995 to begin a year of training and evaluation. Upon completion of training, Husband was named the Astronaut Office representative for Advanced Projects at Johnson Space Center, working on Space Shuttle Upgrades, the Crew Return Vehicle (CRV) and studies to return to the Moon and travel to Mars. He eventually served as Chief of Safety for the Astronaut Office. He flew as pilot on STS-96 in 1999, and logged 235 hours and 13 minutes in space. Husband was later assigned to command the crew of STS-107, which was launched early in 2003. Along with the rest of the STS-107 crew, Husband was killed upon reentry when the shuttle exploded over Texas.

Shuttle missions
STS-96 (May 27 to June 6, 1999) aboard the Space Shuttle Discovery was a 10-day mission during which the crew performed the first docking with the International Space Station and delivered four tons of logistics and supplies in preparation for the arrival of the first crew to live on the station early the following year. The mission was accomplished in 153 Earth orbits, traveling 4 million miles in 9 days, 19 hours and 13 minutes.
STS-107 (January 16 to February 1, 2003) aboard the Space Shuttle Columbia was a 16-day mission during which the crew performed over 80 experiments testing applications of microgravity to gain insight into the environment of space and improve life on Earth as well as enable future space exploration. The mission ended on the morning of February 1 when the shuttle disintegrated upon reentry killing all crew members, including Husband (see Space Shuttle Columbia disaster).

Awards and decorations

Two NASA Group Achievement Awards.

Tributes
Husband Hall, in the Columbia Village apartments, at the Florida Institute of Technology.
Husband Mission, one of the projects in the educational SpaceLab Program, run by the Ramon Foundation  in memory of Ilan Ramon. Involves the writing of new Wikipedia entries on a variety of space and STEM related topics.
Husband Hill, one of the Columbia Hills on Mars.
Asteroid 51823 Rickhusband.
Rick Husband Amarillo International Airport, in his hometown of Amarillo, Texas.
Husband Auditorium, Squadron Officer School building, Maxwell AFB, Alabama.
Rick Husband Drive, El Paso, Texas.
Husband-Boeing Engineering Honors Program at California State University, Fresno
S.S. Rick Husband, the Cygnus CRS OA-6 unmanned resupply spacecraft.
 The lunar crater Husband is named after Husband.

Quotes
Husband describes how he became a shuttle commander having flown in only one other space flight:

"I was just at the right place at the right time."

Rick Husband before his first flight:

"It [space] was just so incredibly adventurous and exciting to me. I just thought there was no doubt in my mind that is what I want to do when I grow up."

Husband was also well known for his faith, and in the last-request forms that astronauts fill out before every flight, he left his pastor a personal note:
"Tell them about Jesus; he's real to me."

Personal life

Husband's wife Evelyn (born September 18, 1958) details her Christian life with Rick and his struggles to fulfill his lifelong dream to become an astronaut in the 2004 book High Calling: The Courageous Life and Faith of Space Shuttle Columbia Commander Rick Husband co-written with Donna VanLiere. The Husbands have two children: a daughter, Laura Marie (born October 5, 1990), and a son, Matthew (born August 3, 1995). Evelyn married Bill Thompson in January 2008 and was the keynote speaker for the memorial ceremony at the Astronaut Memorial "Space Mirror" at the Kennedy Space Center in Florida, five years after the Space Shuttle Columbia tragedy.

See also

Space science
Space Shuttle Columbia disaster

References

External links

Rick Husband STS-107 Crew Memorial
Spacefacts biography of Rick Husband
Florida Today – Florida Tech dedicates dorms to Columbia 7 – October 29, 2003
 High Calling: The Courageous Life and Faith of Space Shuttle Columbia Commander Rick Husband by Evelyn Husband and Donna VanLiere (Jan 11, 2004)
 
 Husband-Boeing Engineering Honors Program at California State University
 Inaugural Husband-Boeing Engineering Honors Scholars

1957 births
2003 deaths
Space Shuttle Columbia disaster
Accidental deaths in Texas
Aviators from Texas
Aviators killed in aviation accidents or incidents in the United States
People from Amarillo, Texas
Amarillo High School alumni
Husband, Rick D.
U.S. Air Force Test Pilot School alumni
United States Air Force astronauts
Recipients of the Congressional Space Medal of Honor
Recipients of the Defense Distinguished Service Medal
California State University, Fresno alumni
American flight instructors
Space Shuttle program astronauts
Recipients of the NASA Distinguished Service Medal
Christians from Texas